Protogrammus is a genus of dragonets found in the Atlantic and Pacific Oceans.

Species
There are currently 3 recognized species in this genus:
 Protogrammus alboranensis R. Fricke, Ordines, Farias & García-Ruiz, 2016 
 Protogrammus antipodus R. Fricke, 2006
 Protogrammus sousai (Maul, 1972) (Meteor dragonet)

References

Callionymidae
Marine fish genera